Sacosperma is a genus of flowering plants belonging to the family Rubiaceae.

Its native range is Western Tropical Africa to Angola.

Species
Species:

Sacosperma paniculatum 
Sacosperma parviflorum

References

Rubiaceae
Rubiaceae genera